The African Qualification Tournament for the 2016 Men's Olympic Volleyball Tournament was held in Brazzaville, Congo from 7 to 12 January 2016.

Qualification
7 CAVB national teams which had not yet qualified to the 2016 Summer Olympics entered qualification.

Pools composition

Venue
 Henri Elende Hall, Brazzaville, Congo

Pool standing procedure
 Number of matches won
 Match points
 Sets ratio
 Points ratio
 Result of the last match between the tied teams

Match won 3–0 or 3–1: 3 match points for the winner, 0 match points for the loser
Match won 3–2: 2 match points for the winner, 1 match point for the loser

Preliminary round
All times are West Africa Time (UTC+01:00).

Pool A

Pool B

Final round
All times are West Africa Time (UTC+01:00).

5th–6th places

5th place match

Final four

Semifinals

3rd place match

Final

Final standing
{| class="wikitable" style="text-align:center;"
|-
!width=40|Rank
!Team
!Qualification
|- bgcolor=#ccffcc
|1
|style="text-align:left;"|
| 2016 Summer Olympics
|- bgcolor=#ffffcc
|2
|style="text-align:left;"|
| rowspan=2 | 2016 2nd World OlympicQualification Tournament
|- bgcolor=#ffffcc
|3
|style="text-align:left;"|
|-
|4
|style="text-align:left;"|
| rowspan=4 |
|-
|5
|style="text-align:left;"|
|-
|6
|style="text-align:left;"|
|-
|7
|style="text-align:left;"|
|}

See also
Volleyball at the 2016 Summer Olympics – Women's African qualification

References

External links
Official website

2016 in volleyball
Volleyball qualification for the 2016 Summer Olympics
International sports competitions hosted by the Republic of the Congo